Margaret Baba Diri is a Ugandan politician who was first elected into the Ugandan Parliament as a representative of people with disabilities in 1996 where she has been to date. Prior to joining politics she worked as a teacher at St. Charles Lwanga in Koboko between 1976 and 1990 and also as a gender development officer at National Union of Disabled Persons of Uganda (NUDIPU) between 1992 and 1996.

Early life and education 

Margaret Baba Diri was born on 29 June 1954. She holds a Diploma in Education from the National Teachers College Kyambogo, she also obtained a Bachelor in Adult and Community Education from Kyambogo University.

Career 

Margaret Baba Diri started her career as a teacher at St. Charles Lwanga Koboko between 1976 and 1990 and as a gender development officer at the National Union of Disabled Persons of Uganda (NUDIPU) between 1992 and 1996.

She later joined politics as a representative of persons with disabilities. She has been in Parliament for five terms from 1996 within which she also represented Koboko as a Woman Member of Parliament. Margaret Baba Diri is a member of the Parliamentary Committee on Commissions, State Authorities and State Enterprises and also a member of the Parliamentary Committee on Education and Sports.

Personal life 

Margaret Baba Diri is a widow.

References 

Members of the Parliament of Uganda
Living people
Women members of the Parliament of Uganda
Ugandan disability rights activists
1954 births
20th-century Ugandan women politicians
20th-century Ugandan politicians
21st-century Ugandan women politicians
21st-century Ugandan politicians
Politicians with disabilities
Ugandan feminists
20th-century Ugandan educators
Kyambogo University alumni
20th-century women educators